Christianity is the largest religion in the Northeastern Indian state of Arunachal Pradesh, which borders China. According to the census of 2011 Christians constitute 30.26% of the state's population. The Roman Catholic Church is the largest Christian denomination in the state with around 180,000 adherents. The Arunachal Baptist Church Council is the second largest denomination with 150,000 baptized members in about 1,200 churches and Arunachal Pradesh Christian Revival Church Council (APCRCC) which started in 1987 at Naharlagun also growing fast.

The state belongs to the area of the diocese of North East India of the Church of North India. The Roman Catholic Diocese of Itanagar and the Roman Catholic Diocese of Miao have their seat in the state. The state is an area of rapid growth of Roman Catholicism in recent years.

Among the Christians in the state there is a literacy rate higher than the rate in the state population at large.

Christian missionary activity is not allowed in Arunachal Pradesh. Arunachal has prohibited bribery or coercion for conversion since 1978, but there is no record of coerced conversions and no one has been brought to trial under the law.

Demography

Trends
Percentage of Christians in Arunachal Pradesh by decades

Tribes
Percentage of Christians in the Scheduled Tribes

See also
 Arunachal Baptist Church Council
 Christian Revival Church
 Arunachal Pradesh Christian Revival Church Council
 List of Christian denominations in North East India
 Persecution of Christians
 Christianity in India

References

 
Religion in Arunachal Pradesh